The United States District Court for the Canal Zone (in case citations, D.C.Z.) was a United States District Court that existed in the Panama Canal Zone of Panama from 1914 to 1982.

Appeals were taken to the United States Court of Appeals for the Fifth Circuit.

History

The District was established in 1914. It was originally under the War Department but in 1933 was transferred to the Department of Justice.

The court was abolished, effective March 31, 1982, as part of the process of returning the Canal Zone to Panama. Cases then pending in the Canal Zone court were transferred to the United States District Court for the Eastern District of Louisiana in New Orleans.

Judges

Further reading
An Experiment in US Territorial Governance: The District of the Canal Zone and its Federal Court (1904-1979)

References

External links
Executive Order #7676, The Canal Zone Judiciary by Franklin Delano Roosevelt
Pictures of the Panama Canal Zone District Courthouse from the United States Marshals Service

Panama Canal Zone
Panama Canal Zone
1914 establishments in the United States
1982 disestablishments in the United States
Courts and tribunals established in 1914
Courts and tribunals disestablished in 1982